Vernal, the county seat and largest city in Uintah County is in northeastern Utah, approximately  east of Salt Lake City and  west of the Colorado border. As of the 2010 census, the city population was 9,089. The population has since grown to 10,370 as of the 2018 population estimate.

History
Vernal, unlike most Utah towns, was not settled by Mormon Settlers. Brigham Young sent a scouting party to the area Uintah Basin in 1861 and received word back the area was good for nothing but nomad purposes, hunting grounds for Indians, and "to hold the world together." That same year, President Abraham Lincoln set the area aside as the Uintah Indian Reservation, with Captain Pardon Dodds appointed Indian agent. Dodds later built the first cabin erected by a white man in the Uintah Basin around 1868. Settlers began to filter in after that, and built cabins in various spots on or near Ashley Creek. In 1879 many came close to perishing during the infamous "Hard Winter" of that same year.

Geography
Vernal is in the Uintah Basin, bordered on the north by the Uinta Mountains, one of the relatively few mountain ranges which lie in an east–west rather than the usual north to south direction. The Book Cliffs lie to the south, and Blue Mountain to the east, while Vernal itself lies in Ashley Valley, named in honor of William H. Ashley, an early fur trader who entered this area in 1825 by floating down the Green River in a bull boat made of animal hides.

The city is in a high desert area of the Colorado Plateau.

According to the United States Census Bureau, the city has a total area of 4.6 square miles (11.9 km2), all land.

Climate
Vernal has a cold semi-arid climate (Köppen: BSk) with low humidity.

Demographics

As of the census of 2000, there were 7,714 people, 2,709 households, and 1,977 families residing in the city. The population density was 1,683.4 people per square mile (650.3/km2). There were 2,957 housing units at an average density of 645.3 per square mile (249.3/km2). The racial makeup of the city was 94.52% White, 0.18% African American, 2.31% Native American, 0.34% Asian, 0.05% Pacific Islander, 1.18% from other races, and 1.43% from two or more races. Hispanic or Latino of any race were 4.45% of the population.
There were 2,709 households, out of which 41.2% had children under the age of 18 living with them, 57.8% were married couples living together, 12.1% had a female householder with no husband present, and 27.0% were non-families. 22.9% of all households were made up of individuals, and 9.9% had someone living alone who was 65 years of age or older. The average household size was 2.77 and the average family size was 3.28.

In the city, the population was spread out, with 32.3% under the age of 18, 13.0% from 18 to 24, 24.8% from 25 to 44, 17.6% from 45 to 64, and 12.3% who were 65 years of age or older. The median age was 28 years. For every 100 females, there were 96.4 males. For every 100 females age 18 and over, there were 91.1 males.

The median income for a household in the city was $30,357, and the median income for a family was $34,453. Males had a median income of $32,137 versus $20,938 for females. The per capita income for the city was $13,497. About 14.7% of families and 14.8% of the population were below the poverty line, including 20.6% of those under age 18 and 8.7% of those age 65 or over.

Economy
Vernal's economy is based on extracting natural resources, including petroleum, natural gas, phosphate, and uintaite (more commonly known as Gilsonite). This has led to the establishment of branch offices of companies such as Halliburton and Schlumberger.

Tourism also plays a role in Vernal's economy due to the town's roots in the Old West and being a large site of ancient dinosaur fossils. Vernal and the surrounding area are popular among outdoor enthusiasts as they are situated near plentiful spots for fishing, fly fishing, hunting, and other outdoor activities.

Education
Vernal's public schools include Ashley Valley Education Center, Uintah High, Uintah Middle School, Vernal Middle, Ashley Elementary, Discovery Elementary, and a branch of Utah State University. In 2015, the Terra Academy opened as a K–12 charter school. Private schools include White House Academy and Uintah Basin Christian Academy. In 2007, Uintah School District built new buildings for two elementary schools, Maeser and Naples Elementary, in the nearby communities to accommodate increased enrollment and eliminate unsafe older buildings. Other area schools include Davis Elementary, Lapoint Elementary, and Eagle View Elementary (pre-K–8). The National Outdoor Leadership School (NOLS) Rocky Mountain River Base.

Transportation

Highways
Vernal is along an east–west federal highway, U.S. Route 40, and a north–south federal highway, U.S. Route 191. (The two highways overlay each other heading west from the city.)

Airport
The city's Vernal Regional Airport has scheduled nonstop air service to Denver (DEN) operated by United Express with CRJ-200 jet aircraft. Passenger service is subsidized by the Essential Air Service (EAS) program.

Public Transportation

Vernal is served by two out of the three Basin Transit Association routes, the Vernal - Roosevelt route (connection available to the Duchesne route in Roosevelt), and the Vernal Circulator, as well as a Salt Lake Express route to Salt Lake City

Attractions

Special events
The Dinosaur Roundup Rodeo is an annual PRCA rodeo held in Vernal during the second weekend of July. It is the most famous event held in Vernal and has been running since the 1930s. This event has been nominated as one of the top five large outdoor rodeos of the year multiple times, and attracts over 500 contestants each year.

Dinah "Soar" Days & Hot Air Balloon Festival features a growing multi-day hot air balloon festival along with numerous other community events, many of which have a hot air balloon theme.

The John Wesley Powell River Festival celebrates the exploration and history of the region with live music, food trucks and activities that focus on local history.

Games, Anime, and More (G.A.M.) is a biannual fan convention. It is a multi-genre convention having video games, card games, cartoons, costumes, tournaments, tabletop gaming, and similar activities. The G.A.M. Convention is held during March and August in Uintah County, Utah. In 2015 it was the first anime convention held in Vernal as well as the first gaming convention held there, making it the first convention of its type in Vernal. In 2016 it was held in Naples, Utah for the first time, making G.A.M. the first convention of its type in the city of Naples.

The Home, Garden & Outdoor Sports Show is an annual event presented by the radio stations KLCY and KVEL. It features gardening, home improvement, and outdoor equipment and information. It is held on the first Friday and Saturday of April.

The Gun & Knife Show happens the first Saturday and Sunday of March.

Since 1973 Vernal has been the host of the Tournament of Champions wrestling tournament for high school wrestlers. It is the longest continuing invitational wrestling tournament in the state of Utah. Created by Uintah head wrestling coach Dennis Preece, the tournament draws teams from across several states in the intermountain region and is known as one of the largest and most competitive high school wrestling tournaments in the western United States.

The Outlaw Trail Festival of the Arts, which features a juried art contest and show, has been running in Vernal for the last 26 years. It runs for several weeks every June.

The Uintah County Fair occurs Thursday through Saturday each year in the second week of June.

The Outlaw Trail Theater presents stage plays during the summer in June and July.

The Dinaland Car Show happens annually in July.

The Ashley Valley Farmers' Market occurs from July through September.

The radio station KNEU presents Alive After 5 events in the summer.

A number of 5K runs and other outdoor walking events occur throughout the year.

July plays host to the annual craft fair on the Uintah County building's front lawn.

Vernal features yearly parades for certain holidays such as Independence Day on July 4 and Pioneer Day on July 24th.

There is an Easter Egg hunt at the Utah Field House of Natural History each year on the Saturday before Easter.

Points of interest
Lookout Point rests on the western edge overlooking Ashley Valley, the valley in which Vernal is situated.

The Vernal branch of Zion's Bank was mailed through USPS one brick at a time.

Dinah the Pink Dinosaur, the welcome sign on the east side of town (Which at some point used to be orange and had eyes that would follow cars, but both of those features no longer exist.)

Notable buildings

The Bank of Vernal (a.k.a. the 'Parcel Post' Bank) Building (3 West Main Street) is a registered historical building in the Uintah County Landmark Register. Also known as "the Bank that was sent by Mail", the Bank of Vernal was constructed in 1916-1917 by William H. Coltharp, a Vernal businessman and entrepreneur. The Parcel Post brick shipments were transported from Salt Lake to Mack, Colorado by Denver & Rio Grande Railroad, then proceeded to Watson via the narrow gauge Uintah Railway, finally Vernal by wagon freight through steep roads. The full trip was over 420 miles (675.9 km) long. The United States Postmaster General Albert Sidney Burleson explicitly stated in a letter that "it is not the intent of the United States Postal Service that buildings be shipped through the mail" Today the building is used as a branch office of Zions Bank.

The Quarry Visitor Center in Dinosaur National Monument, and the Vernal Utah Temple are other historic Vernal buildings. The Vernal Temple is a small LDS temple in the old Vernal Tabernacle. It was built as the result of a local movement to save the old tabernacle when it was scheduled for demolition.

Notable people
 Ron Abegglen, former Weber State men's basketball coach, born and raised in Vernal
 Earl W. Bascom, inventor; Hall of Fame rodeo cowboy, "father of modern rodeo," Hollywood actor, international artist and sculptor.
 Texas Rose Bascom (1922-1993), rodeo performer, fancy trick roper, Hollywood actor, National Cowgirl Hall of Fame inductee
 Clair Burgener, U.S. Representative from California (1973–1983)
 Lane Frost, rodeo star, PRCA Bull Riding Champion of the World, attended junior high school in Vernal
 E. Gordon Gee, academic who held more university presidencies than any other American
 Douglas Kent Hall; writer and photographer; Academy Award winner
 Dallin H. Oaks, president of Brigham Young University, Utah Supreme Court Justice, member of the First Presidency of the Church of Jesus Christ of Latter-day Saints
 Dennis Preece, Hall of Fame wrestling coach at local high school in Vernal
 James Woods, film and television actor, was born in Vernal

See also

 Dinosaur National Monument
 Flaming Gorge National Recreation Area
 Flaming Gorge Dam
 Book Cliffs
 Ashley National Forest
 Green River (Colorado River)
 Ouray National Wildlife Refuge
 Browns Park National Wildlife Refuge
 Uintah and Ouray Indian Reservation
 High Uintas Wilderness

References

External links

 

Populated places established in 1876
Cities in Utah
County seats in Utah
Cities in Uintah County, Utah
Micropolitan areas of Utah
1876 establishments in Utah Territory